Yoshie Takeshita (竹下 佳江 Takeshita Yoshie, born March 18, 1978) is a retired Japanese volleyball player who played for JT Marvelous. She served as Head Coach of Japanese volleyball team Victorina Himeji. and now serves as Executive Adviser.

She played for the All-Japan women's volleyball team and was a participant at the 2004 Summer Olympics, 2008 Summer Olympics and 2012 Olympics. At the 2012 Olympics, she was part of the Japanese team that won the bronze medal.  She was also part of the 2010 Japanese Women's team that won bronze at the world championships, beating the US in the bronze medal match.

Her nickname was World's smallest and strongest setter (世界 最小 最強 セッター Sekai saisho saikyo setter). She was the captain of the Japanese volleyball team during the 2006 World Championship and took the most valuable player award.

On 28 September 2012 JT Marvelous announced her retirement.　On 21 June 2013 Takeshita was selected to become a member of the directors of Japan Volleyball Association.

Her husband is the Japanese baseball player Hirotaka Egusa.

Profile 
She became a volleyball player at 10 years old.
Her nickname is "Tenn", though she has not publicly revealed the meaning or origin of the nickname.

Clubs 
 Shiranuijoshi High School
 NEC Red Rockets (1996–2002)
 JT Marvelous (2002-2012)

Awards

Individual 

 2004 Olympic Qualifier "Best Setter"
 2006 World Championship "Most Valuable Player"
 2006 World Championship "Best Setter"
 2008 Olympic Qualifier "Best Setter"
 2008 FIVB World Grand Prix "Best Setter"
 2009 FIVB World Grand Prix "Best Setter"
 2011 World Cup "Best Setter"

Team 
1998 4th V.League -  Runner-Up, with NEC Red Rockets.
2000 6th V.League -  Champion, with NEC Red Rockets.
2001 Kurowashiki All Japan Volleyball Championship -  Champion, with NEC Red Rockets.
2002 8th V.League -  Runner-Up, with NEC Red Rockets.
2003 Kurowashiki All Japan Volleyball Championship -  Runner-Up, with JT Marvelous.
2004 Kurowashiki All Japan Volleyball Championship -  Runner-Up, with JT Marvelous.
2006-2007 V.Premier League -  Runner-Up, with JT Marvelous.
2007 Kurowashiki All Japan Volleyball Championship -  Runner-Up, with JT Marvelous.
2009-2010 V.Premier League -  Runner-Up, with JT Marvelous.
2010 Kurowashiki All Japan Volleyball Tournament -  Runner-Up, with JT Marvelous.
2010-2011 V.Premier League -  Champion, with JT Marvelous.
2011 Kurowashiki All Japan Volleyball Tournament -  Champion, with JT Marvelous.

National team

Senior team 
2003: 5th place in the World Cup in Japan
2004: 5th place in the Olympic Games of Athens
2005:  Bronze Medal in the 13th Senior Asian Championship
2006: 6th place in the World Championship in Japan
2006:  Silver Medal in Asian Game 2006
2007: 7th place in the World Cup in Japan
2007:  Gold Medal in the 14th Senior Asian Championship at Thailand
2008: 5th place in the Olympic Games of Beijing
2010:  Bronze Medal in the World Championship
2011: 5th place in the World Grand Prix Final round
2011:  Silver Medal in the 16th Senior Asian Championship
2011: 4th place in the World Cup in Japan
2012:  Bronze Medal in the Olympic Games of London

References

External links 
 FIVB biography
 Official Profile - Amuse, Inc. 

1978 births
Japanese women's volleyball players
Living people
Volleyball players at the 2004 Summer Olympics
Olympic volleyball players of Japan
Sportspeople from Kitakyushu
Volleyball players at the 2008 Summer Olympics
NEC Red Rockets players
JT Marvelous players
Volleyball players at the 2012 Summer Olympics
Olympic bronze medalists for Japan
Olympic medalists in volleyball
Medalists at the 2012 Summer Olympics
Asian Games medalists in volleyball
Volleyball players at the 2006 Asian Games
Asian Games silver medalists for Japan
Medalists at the 2006 Asian Games
Amuse Inc. talents
21st-century Japanese women singers
21st-century Japanese singers